Alfred David McWaters was mayor of Toowoomba, Queensland in 1916.  He was also an alderman on the Toowoomba City Council in 1914–1915 and 1918–1921.  He was born in Ballarat, Victoria and worked as a grazier before moving to Toowoomba.

References

Mayors of Toowoomba
People from Ballarat
Queensland local councillors
Year of birth missing
Year of death missing